Kaiapoi was a rural New Zealand electorate, north of Christchurch in the Canterbury region of New Zealand from 1861 to 1946. It was represented by twelve Members of Parliament.

Population centres
The electorate was centred on the town of Kaiapoi to the north of Christchurch.

History
The electorate dates from 1861. Isaac Cookson was the first representative after winning the 1861. Cookson had previously represented the Christchurch Country electorate, which was abolished at the end of the term of the 2nd Parliament in 1960. Cookson resigned in 1863, and the resulting  was won by Robert Wilkin.

The resulting  was won by John Studholme, who was confirmed at the  but resigned in 1874. Bowen was confirmed in the 1875 and s. Bowen retired at the 1881 election.

Isaac Wilson was elected in 1881, but resigned before the end of the term due to failing health. Edward Richardson stood in the 16 May . He was returned unopposed. In the 1887 election, his opponent was Richard Moore.

From 1925, his Liberal Party called itself 'National Party' for two years. Buddo retired in 1928.

Williams held the electorate until it was abolished in 1946.

Members of Parliament
Key

Election results

1943 election

1938 election

1935 election

 
 
 
 

 

Table footnotes:

1931 election

1928 election

1925 election

1922 election

1919 election

1914 election

1899 election

1893 election

1890 election

1875 by-election

1866 election

Notes

References

Historical electorates of New Zealand
1860 establishments in New Zealand
1946 disestablishments in New Zealand
Waimakariri District
Kaiapoi